The flag of Evenk Autonomous Okrug, in the Russian Federation, is a horizontal tricolor of light blue, white, and dark blue, all of which stand for the polar days and nights in Northern Siberia.  It is charged in the center by a red kumalan, the solar emblem in Evenki culture.

The flag was designed by Russian artist, Sergei Salatkin, prior to the okrug's merge to Krasnoyarsk Krai on 1 January 2007. It was approved by the district assembly of Evenk on 23 March 1995. The proportions were 2:3.

References
Flags of the World

Flag
Flags of the federal subjects of Russia
Evenk
Evenk